West Loch of Skaw is a loch of northern-central Whalsay, Shetland Islands, Scotland, to the southwest of the village of Skaw, Whalsay.

References

Lochs of Whalsay